The list of ship launches in 1877 includes a chronological list of some ships launched in 1877.


References

1877
Ship launches